Matthew Creamer is an American reporter and an Editor-at-Large at Advertising Age magazine. He writes about marketing, advertising, media, and pop culture.

Career 
Creamer is currently Editor-at-Large at AdAge magazine. He previously worked as an associate editor at PRWeek magazine, where he covered media. Before that, Creamer wrote about environmental issues for Alabama's Anniston Star. He has also written for the New York Daily News and the New York Observer and frequently provides analysis to major news outlets (such as NBC, ABC, NPR, and CNBC), daily newspapers, and wire services. Creamer also writes a blog about online media.

Awards 
In 2006, Creamer was awarded two major business journalism awards: A Neal Award in the category of best news coverage for his writing about the trial of two advertising executives that defrauded the U.S. government's anti-drug ad campaign, and a breaking news award from the Society of American Business Editors and Writers (SABEW) for his story about the high-profile departure of two Wal-Mart executives.
Creamer is an ardent supporter of pro sports teams from Philadelphia.

External links
 Matthew Creamer's website and blog
 Matt Creamer's articles on AdAge

Living people
Year of birth missing (living people)